Marc Ferrez may refer to:
 Marc Ferrez (photographer) (1843–1923), son of Zéphyrin Ferrez
 Marc Ferrez (sculptor) (1788–1850), sculptor, brother of Zéphyrin Ferrez